Jack Lentz (born February 22, 1945) is a former American football defensive back. He played for the Denver Broncos from 1967 to 1968 and for the Montreal Alouettes in 1969.

References

1945 births
Living people
American football defensive backs
Holy Cross Crusaders football players
Denver Broncos players
Montreal Alouettes players